Ferenc Berkes (born 8 August 1985) is a Hungarian chess grandmaster. He is an eight-time Hungarian Chess Champion, winning in 2004, 2007, 2010, 2012, 2013, 2014, 2016 and 2018. 

In 2002, he was World Under 18 Champion. 

In 2004 he tied for 4th–16th in the 3rd Aeroflot Open in Moscow. 

He took part in the Chess World Cup 2011, but was eliminated in the second round by Zahar Efimenko.

He tied 3rd to 11th place in the 2019 European Individual Championship with Kacper Piorun, David Anton Guijarro, Niclas Huschenbeth, Sergei Movsesian, Liviu-Dieter Nisipeanu, Grigoriy Oparin, Maxim Rodshtein, and Eltaj Safarli.

References

External links
 
 
 
 

1985 births
Living people
Hungarian chess players
Chess grandmasters
Chess Olympiad competitors
World Youth Chess Champions